Sportplatz 3 Sapins is a stadium in Echallens, Switzerland.  It is currently used for football matches and is the home ground of FC Echallens. The capacity is 2000 and is the opposite of the modern all seater stadiums in that it is standing-room only.

References
https://int.soccerway.com/teams/switzerland/fc-echallens/venue/

See also
List of football stadiums in Switzerland

Football venues in Switzerland